Eugène de Kermadec (1899 Paris – 1976) was a French painter.

Biography
Eugène de Kermadec studied at the École des Arts Decoratifs in 1915 and later at the École des Beaux Arts. During this time Paris was the center of the avant-garde, and the painterly language was Cubism. Kermadec, along with several foreign and French artists came into Cubism after 1918 when more and more artists adopting this technique and that the almost scientific approach was relaxed and replaced by a more lyrical style and figurative style. His first show was in 1929. From early on the Galerie Louise Leiris, which gallery was the centre of the avant-garde and the Cubists.

Notes and references
Exhibition Galerie Louise Leiris, Paris, 1929
Exhibition Gallerie Annick Gendron, Paris, 1973
Catalog exhibition : E. de Kermadec 1899 -1976. Dernières oeuvres Paris, Galerie Louise Leiris, 1977

External links
 Grovesnor Gallery

1899 births
1976 deaths
20th-century French painters
20th-century French male artists
French male painters
Abstract expressionist artists
Modern painters